Tillandsia stricta is a species in the genus Tillandsia. This species is native to South America and Trinidad.

Two varieties are recognized:

Tillandsia stricta var. disticha L.B.Sm - State of Paraná in Brazil
Tillandsia stricta var. stricta - Trinidad, Guyana, Suriname, Venezuela, Brazil, Bolivia, Paraguay, Uruguay, Argentina

Cultivars

 Tillandsia 'Azure Flame'
 Tillandsia 'Bingo'
 Tillandsia 'Bushfire'
 Tillandsia 'Coconut Ice'
 Tillandsia 'Cooran'
 Tillandsia 'Cooroy'
 Tillandsia 'Cotton Candy'
 Tillandsia 'Feather Duster'
 Tillandsia 'Fire And Ice'
 Tillandsia 'Flaming Cascade'
 Tillandsia 'Flaming Spire'
 Tillandsia 'Gardicta'
 Tillandsia 'Houston'
 Tillandsia 'Imbroglio'
 Tillandsia 'J. R.'
 Tillandsia 'Kayjay'
 Tillandsia 'Lilac Spire'
 Tillandsia 'Millenium'
 Tillandsia 'Mystic Albert'
 Tillandsia 'Ned Kelly'
 Tillandsia 'Perky Pink'
 Tillandsia 'Poor Ixy'
 Tillandsia 'Quicksilver'
 Tillandsia 'Really Red'
 Tillandsia 'Rolly Reilly'
 Tillandsia 'Sexton'
 Tillandsia 'Southern Cross'
 Tillandsia 'Tamaree'
 Tillandsia 'Ty's Prize'
 Tillandsia 'Winner's Circle'

References

stricta
Flora of South America
Flora of Brazil
Flora of the Atlantic Forest
Flora of Trinidad and Tobago
Plants described in 1813